Jovan Oliver Grčinić (ca. 1310-1356) was a magnate of the Serbian Emperor Dušan the Mighty (r. 1331-1355), holding the titles of sebastokrator and despotes, and the rank of "great voivode", showing his prominence and status as one of the most important nobles of Dušan. Oliver supported Dušan in the succession war against his father, and was one of the supreme generals in the southern military expeditions (Macedonia, Thessaly). His province included Ovče Pole and the left bank of the Vardar. After the death of Emperor Dušan, there are no more mentions of Oliver. During the fall of the Serbian Empire, his lands were held by the Dejanovići.

Life
Jovan was the son a vlastelin Grčin (Грчин, "Greek") who had lands in some part of the Serbian Kingdom.

Jovan is referred to in a Ragusan source as Oliver Grčinić, and his knowledge of Greek lends support to the notion of a Greek origin. He ruled his domain, in modern-day North Macedonia, as a semi-independent prince, acknowledging Dušan's suzerainty but not subordinate to him. He probably had supported Dušan's overthrow of his father, King Uroš III, in 1331, and after the death of his first wife, Karavida, in 1336, he married Maria Palaiologina, Dušan's stepmother. There is considerable scholarly debate as to when Jovan Oliver acquired his domains, i.e. whether he held them before Dušan's accession, whether they were granted to him by Dušan as a reward for his support, or whether he gained them as a result of his marriage to Maria.

At any rate, he was one of the most powerful nobles under Dušan, and exercised considerable influence over him, as evidenced in the negotiations in July 1342 which led to the decision to support John VI Kantakouzenos in the Byzantine civil war of 1341–1347, in exchange for which he hoped to marry his daughter to Manuel Kantakouzenos. He was also active in the 1334 war with the Byzantine Empire, and was present during the subsequent peace negotiations together with Vratko Nemanjić, when Jovan was probably named despotes by Andronikos III Palaiologos. With the death of Hrelja in late 1342, when the latter's domain was split between Jovan Oliver and Dušan, he was able to further expand his lands, including the important towns of Štip and Strumica.

In 1341, imitating the Serbian kings, he built the Eastern Orthodox Lesnovo monastery as his endowment. Jovan Oliver outlived Dušan, but after his death, his sons were unable to assert themselves: possibly opposed by a coalition of other nobles, they failed to acquire any positions of importance, and most of their father's lands were taken over by Constantine and John, the sons of sebastokrator Dejan Dragaš of Kumanovo.

Family
He had 7 children:
Danica
Krajko (or Krajmir)
Damnjan (or Damjan)
Vidoslav
Dabiživ
Rusin
Oliver

References

Sources
 

Serbian knights
14th-century Serbian nobility
Generals of Stefan Dušan
People of the Serbian Empire
Medieval Serbian military leaders
Medieval Serbian people of Greek descent
Medieval Macedonia
Despots of the Serbian Empire
Year of birth uncertain
1356 deaths
Sebastokrators
Medieval Serbian magnates
Ktetors
Founders of Christian monasteries
14th-century Serbian judges
Boyars of Stefan Dušan